Nathaniel Archibald (1952 – January 18, 2018) was an American basketball player. He is best known for his collegiate career with the Alcorn State Braves, with whom he was named the Southwestern Athletic Conference (SWAC) Player of the Year as a junior in 1973. He earned back-to-back first-team all-SWAC honors during his final two seasons. During his college career, Archibald scored 1,240 points and grabbed 968 rebounds. He went on to attend graduate school at Alcorn State University and spent time as an assistant coach for the basketball team.

References

1952 births
2018 deaths
Alcorn State Braves basketball coaches
Alcorn State Braves basketball players
American men's basketball coaches
American men's basketball players
Basketball players from Alabama
Centers (basketball)